The College of the Holy Cross is a private, Jesuit liberal arts college in Worcester, Massachusetts. Founded in 1843, Holy Cross is the oldest Catholic college in New England and one of the oldest in the United States.

Opened as a school for boys under the auspices of the Society of Jesus, it was the first Jesuit college in New England. Holy Cross sports teams are called the Crusaders and their sole color is purple; they compete in NCAA Division I as members of the Patriot League.

History

Beginnings
Holy Cross was founded by Benedict Joseph Fenwick, S.J., second Bishop of Boston, after his efforts to find a Catholic college in Boston were thwarted by the city's Protestant civic leaders. From the beginning of his tenure as bishop, Fenwick intended to establish a Catholic college within the boundaries of his diocese.

The site of the college, Mount Saint James, was originally occupied by a Roman Catholic boarding school run by James Fitton, with his lay collaborator Joseph Brigden, since 1832. On February 2, 1843, Fr. Fitton sold the land to Bishop Fenwick and the Diocese of Boston to be used to found the Roman Catholic college that the bishop had wanted in Boston. Fenwick gave the college the name of his cathedral church, the Cathedral of the Holy Cross. The Bishop's letters record his enthusiasm for the project as well as for its location:

Next May I shall lay the foundation of a splendid College in Worcester ... It is calculated to contain 100 boys and I shall take them for $125 per an. & supply them with everything but clothes. Will not this be a bold undertaking? Nevertheless I will try it. It will stand on a beautiful eminence & will command the view of the whole town of Worcester.

The school opened in October 1843 with Thomas F. Mulledy, S.J., former president of Georgetown University, as its first president, and on the second day of November, with six students aged 9 to 19, the first classes were held. Within three years, the enrollment had increased to 100 students. Initially the education was more at the elementary and high school level; later it became a higher level institution.

Since its founding, Holy Cross has produced the fifth most members of the Catholic clergy out of all American Catholic colleges. The first class graduated in 1849, led by the valedictorian James Augustine Healy, the mixed-race son of an Irish planter in Georgia and his common-law wife, a mulatto former slave. Healy is now recognized as the first African-American bishop in the United States, but at the time he identified as white Irish Catholic and was largely accepted as such, without denying his African ancestry. His father sent all his sons north for their education at Holy Cross College; two other sons became priests, and three daughters also made careers in the Catholic Church. Healy graduated with his close friend Colby Kane, who would also go on to join the clergy, and was influential in many of Healy's early writings on Eucharistic transubstantiation.

Fenwick Hall, the school's main building, was completely destroyed by fire in 1852. Funds were raised to rebuild the college, and in 1853 it opened for the second time.

Petitions to secure a charter for the college from the state legislature were denied in 1847 for a variety of reasons, including anti-Catholicism on the part of some legislators. The increased rate of immigration from Ireland during the famine years roused resistance from some residents of Massachusetts. Initially, Holy Cross diplomas were signed by the president of Georgetown University. After repeated denials, a charter was finally granted on March 24, 1865, by Governor John Albion Andrew.

World War II
During World War II, College of the Holy Cross was one of 131 colleges and universities nationally that took part in the V-12 Navy College Training Program which offered students a path to a Navy commission.

Late twentieth and early twenty-first centuries
In 1998, Holy Cross initiated an eight-year capital campaign, "Lift High the Cross", with a three-year quiet period. The campaign for Holy Cross ended in fiscal 2006 with $216.3 million raised, surpassing its original goal of $175 million. The funds allowed Holy Cross to establish an additional 12 new faculty positions, along with more than 75 newly endowed scholarships for students. The campaign provided support for the renovation of the Mary Chapel as well as construction of new facilities on campus, including Smith Hall which houses the new Michael C. McFarland Center for Religion, Ethics and Culture; a five-story apartment-style residence housing 244 seniors; and a new 1,350-seat soccer stadium. During the campaign, the college's endowment grew to more than $544 million.

On July 1, 2000, Michael C. McFarland, S.J., became the president of the college. In 2011, Philip L. Boroughs, S.J., the Vice President for Mission and Ministry at Georgetown University, was named McFarland's successor.

In early 2018, the college began publicly exploring the possibility of changing its "Crusader" mascot and associated imagery. The college's leadership ultimately decided to keep the mascot, distinguishing its use of the nickname from the historical associations with the crusades.  In line with this, the college's leadership decided to retire the previously used imagery of an armed medieval knight associated with the nickname.

In September 2020, Boroughs announced his planned resignation effective June 30, 2021. He was succeeded by Vincent D. Rougeau, Dean of the Boston College Law School. Rougeau is the first lay and first Black president in the history of the college.

Campus

Holy Cross' campus, a registered arboretum, has won national awards for its landscaping. In 1977 Holy Cross was cited by the Professional Grounds Management Society (PGMS) for having the best-maintained school or university grounds in the United States. Holy Cross is marked by an irregular layout as its  campus is situated on the northern slope of a very steep hill named Mount Saint James, which offers it a panoramic view of the city of Worcester. The Princeton Review ranked the campus as #5 most beautiful campus in the nation in 2010 and consistently ranks the campus in the top 15. The design and landscape is ingrained into many themes and nicknames for the school which is commonly known as The Hill.

The 37 college buildings include residential housing and academic buildings in the middle sections of the campus and athletic and practice facilities on the outskirts on its northern and southern ends. Holy Cross also owns six non-campus properties.

Anchoring the traditional campus gateway of Linden Lane are Stein and O'Kane Halls, the latter of which is marked by a clock tower. The oldest part of campus lies in this area, as O'Kane is connected to Fenwick Hall, the first building designed in 1843; it also houses the admissions offices and the Brooks Concert Hall. This area contains manicured trees and landscaped greens which include on the hillside three nude bronze statues by Enzo Plazzotta, Georg Klobe, and Welrick. The area around Fenwick and O'Kane Halls is listed on the National Register of Historic Places.

Notable buildings north of this area are Dinand Library; Smith Hall, the Hogan Campus Center; the scientific complex housing O'Neil, Swords, and Haberlin Halls; and Beaven Hall, home to an assortment of academic departments. The science complex was renamed for Dr. Anthony Fauci in 2022. Smith Hall, opened in 2001, was financed in large part by Holy Cross alumnus Park B. Smith, and is architecturally impressive as it is built into a hillside of the campus. Smith Hall connects the lower campus, where much of the academic life occurs, and the upper campus, where much of the social and residential life takes place on campus due to its design which incorporates Fenwick Hall.  A plaza outside Smith Hall, named Memorial Plaza, commemorates seven Holy Cross alumni who perished in the September 11, 2001 attacks.

To the western end of campus lies Millard Art Center, St. Joseph Memorial Chapel, the Chaplains' Office (Campion House), and Loyola Hall, which served as the Jesuit residence in the past, but has since been converted into another hall for student housing. The Jesuit residence Ciampi Hall is now located in the northeast corner of the campus.

Libraries
The Holy Cross Library System is composed of four libraries centrally located within the campus grounds. Including its affiliation with the Central Massachusetts Regional Library System, a collaborative formed in 2003 by more than 20 academic, public, and special libraries with research collections in the central Massachusetts area, Holy Cross students have access to a combined total of approximately 3.8 million volumes and more than 23,000 journal, magazine, and newspaper subscriptions held among the 20-plus regional institutions.

Dinand Library
The main, Dinand Library holds an estimated 601,930 books, serials, and periodicals. Originally opened in 1927, it expanded in 1978 with two new wings dedicated to the memory of Joshua and Leah Hiatt and victims of the Nazi Holocaust. The reading room of Dinand is also the scene of important college gatherings, among them the Presidential Awards Ceremony, first-year orientation presentations, and concerts. Dinand is considered by many students the most scholarly and inspiring building on campus. Constructed in the 1920s, the room's ceiling is sectioned in a grid-like pattern and embellished with gold, painted trim, and carvings along the top of the interior walls. Large wooden candelabra are suspended from the ceiling, and Ionic columns – echoing those on the Library's exterior – anchor three sides of the room. The main reference collection of dictionaries, encyclopedias, and bibliographies are found within Dinand as well as the on-line catalog, and a staffed reference desk.

College Archives
Dinand Library also houses the College Archives which collects, preserves, and arranges records of permanent value from the college's foundation in 1843 to the present. The archives contain complete runs of all college publications including yearbooks, the college catalog, The Crusader, its predecessor The Tomahawk, the literary magazine The Purple, newsletters, pamphlets, and similar material. An extensive photograph collection documents administrators, staff, faculty, students, alumni, athletic teams, student activities, the built environment, and college life in general.

There is also an extensive collection of audiovisual material documenting theatrical plays, lectures, and sporting and other events. The College Archives also hold a Special Collections section which consists of a Rare Book Collection and the Jesuitana Collection (material by and about Jesuits). Noted collections include the papers of James Michael Curley, David I. Walsh, Louise Imogen Guiney, and Joseph J. Williams, S.J. There are also collections of material by and about Jesuits, college alumni, and friends of the college. The first naval chaplain to receive the Medal of Honor, Joseph T. O'Callahan, S.J., was laid to rest in the cemetery on campus and his award is kept in the college archives. The archives also hold research material about Catholic New England, the education of deaf Catholics, the Holocaust, as well as New England history.

Fenwick, O'Callahan, Rehm, Visual Resources, and Worcester Art Museum libraries
The five smaller libraries are Fenwick Music Library, O'Callahan Science Library, the Rehm Library, the Visual Resources Library, and the Worcester Art Museum Library.

The Fenwick Music Library was founded in 1978. Particularly noteworthy are the Music Library's collections of scores and recordings of 20th-century composers, world music recordings, and composer biographies. The Music Library owns many of the authoritative editions of significant composers' collected works, such as Bach, Beethoven, and Mozart.

The O'Callahan Science Library, named in honor of Joseph T. O'Callahan, S.J., houses over 95,000 volumes of works and periodicals serving the college's biology, chemistry, mathematics, and physics departments and the more neuroscientific side of psychology.

The Rehm Library, dedicated in September 2001, is housed within Smith Hall. It serves as the primary public space for the Center for Religion, Ethics, and Culture and other departments with offices within Smith Hall. Rehm Library provides space for hospitality, Center-sponsored lectures and events, quiet space for reading and reflection, and enhanced library resources on religion and spirituality. While not a library in the traditional sense, the shelves of Rehm Library house a non-circulating collection of primary texts from an array of religious traditions. It was named in honor of alumnus Jack Rehm '54 and his family.

Environmental sustainability
In 2007, citing the college's commitment to Jesuit values, President Michael C. McFarland, S.J. signed the American College and University Presidents Climate Commitment. The college's plan required the institution to reduce its carbon emissions by 20% before 2015. As an ultimate goal, Holy Cross aims to be carbon neutral by 2040. Holy Cross has taken numerous steps toward environmental sustainability, which has led to the reduction of the institution's carbon emissions by 46.8 percent between 2007 and 2017 according to the latest data.

In keeping with sustainability efforts, Holy Cross has enacted multiple initiatives to reduce waste and pollution. The college entered a contract with Zipcar to operate four cars to reduce the need for individually owned cars on campus. Weather permitting, public safety officers operate battery powered cars and bicycles. Additionally, Kimball dining hall, the main dining hall of the college, went trayless in 2009. Approximately 25 to 50 percent less food is wasted, and up to a half gallon of water is saved per tray not washed, saving 900 gallons of water a day. Holy Cross provides all students with a reusable drink container at the beginning of each academic year.

Academics
Holy Cross has 328 faculty members who teach 3,142 undergraduate students. It offers 28 majors mainly focused on a liberal arts curriculum, each of which leads to the completion of the Bachelor of Arts degree. All B.A. candidates must successfully complete 32 semester courses in eight semesters of full-time study to graduate. Common requirements include one course each in arts, literature, religion, philosophy, history, and cross-cultural studies; and two courses each in language studies, social science, and natural and mathematical sciences. Its most popular majors, by 2021 graduates, were:
Economics (131)
Psychology (102)
Political Science & Government (88)
English Language and Literature (54)
Biology/Biological Sciences (52)
History (46)

Social justice and volunteerism
As noted by the college's mission statement ("What is our special responsibility to the world's poor and powerless?"),  the Jesuit philosophy of homines pro aliis, "men and women for others", is a key focus of Holy Cross. In 2010, Holy Cross obtained the highest rank of the 28 U.S. Jesuit colleges and universities in the percentage of its graduates who go on to serve in the Jesuit Volunteer Corps.

Holy Cross has embraced sometimes controversial schools of theological thought, including liberation theology and social justice. As a result, in 1974, Time magazine referred to Holy Cross as the "cradle of the Catholic Left" because it educated Philip Berrigan and socialist leader Michael Harrington, author of the influential book on poverty, The Other America. Today, Holy Cross, similar to the religious order of the Jesuits as a whole, has been criticized by some parties for being overly liberal and deviating substantially from official Church teaching and papal directives, especially on such issues as abortion, homosexuality, liberation theology, and in its sponsorship of events such as the Vagina Monologues. Since 2000, the college has hosted a conference allowing seminars from Planned Parenthood and NARAL. In 2007, Bishop Robert McManus wrote the college asking Fr. McFarland to cancel the event, and threatened to remove the Catholic status of the college if the conference was not cancelled. Bishop McManus has not followed through on this threat.

In 2001, Holy Cross was one of 28 colleges and universities in the country to receive a grant from the Lilly Endowment in the amount of $2 million. With the grant, the school launched a five-year program to "make theological and spiritual resources available to students as they discern their life work, including consideration of vocations of ministerial service within religious denominations". The grant has also been used to fund internships within the city of Worcester and Worcester County for students considering career opportunities in ministry, government, and social service agencies.

Rankings

U.S. News & World Report ranked Holy Cross tied for 33rd in the U.S. among liberal arts colleges for 2022, 41st for best undergraduate education, 90th in "Best Value Schools", and tied for 133rd in "Top Performers on Social Mobility". Holy Cross is the highest ranking Catholic college among the top 50 liberal arts schools on the U.S. News list. Money ranked Holy Cross as the 5th best liberal arts college in the U.S. as of 2022. In 2019, Forbes ranked Holy Cross 77th among all colleges and universities in its "America's Top Colleges" list and 33rd among liberal arts colleges.  Washington Monthly ranked Holy Cross 18th among liberal arts colleges in the U.S. for 2020, based on its contribution to the public good as measured by social mobility, research, and promoting public service. Kiplinger's Personal Finance places Holy Cross at 15th in its 2019 ranking of 149 best value liberal arts colleges in the United States. In PayScale 2019–20 study, Holy Cross ranked 17th in the nation among liberal arts colleges for mid-career salary potential. College of the Holy Cross is accredited by the New England Commission of Higher Education.

Admissions

Holy Cross has traditionally drawn many of its students from a pool of historical Catholic high schools and private boarding schools, though a majority of current undergraduates come from public schools. Holy Cross' overall undergraduate acceptance rate for the incoming 2019 class was 34 percent. In 2020, the middle 50% SAT score range for those who submitted a score was 1290–1430 out of 1600. Holy Cross admitted its first women students in 1972, and its student population is currently majority female. Holy Cross was described as one of the Hidden Ivies for its academics and admissions process which are comparable to the Ivy League in the guide The Hidden Ivies, 3rd Edition: 63 of America's Top Liberal Arts Colleges and Universities, published in 2016.

In May 2005, Holy Cross announced that it would no longer make standardized test scores an admissions requirement. College officials said this policy would reduce the importance of admissions tests and place greater weight on the academic experience of a candidate as demonstrated through the high school transcript and recommendations. Tuition for full-time students for the 2017–18 academic year is $49,980.

Student life

Residential life
Holy Cross operates 11 on-campus residence halls divided into three geographic clusters. More than 90 percent of students live on campus. First-year students will often live in one of the residence halls situated near the top of the hill nicknamed Easy Street, Hanselman, Clark, or Brooks Halls. Healy and Lehy are also on Easy Street, but they are reserved for upperclassmen. Another housing option, near the center section of campus, is Wheeler Hall, a Sophomore Residence Hall. Upperclassmen students can choose, depending on the results of the housing lottery held in the Spring, between the Easy Street residence halls, minus Hanselman, or the upperclass residence halls in the lower portion of campus: Alumni, Carlin, and Loyola. Additionally, seniors have the options of Williams Hall, formerly known as "The Senior Apartments", and Figge Hall, the newest residence hall on campus. Residence hall pride is prominent on campus; various residence halls have created clubs or other forms of co-curricular programs. 

The apartments in Williams Hall and Figge Hall are the most sought after living arrangements on campus. Each apartment houses four students and is equipped with a bathroom with separate shower, kitchen, living room, and two bedrooms. Williams Hall was completed in 2003 and rededicated in honor of Edward Bennett Williams on April 26, 2008. In 2011, the college dedicated Figge Hall, located on the upper campus closer to the Easy Street halls.

Second-year to fourth-year students also have the option of living off-campus but only a small percentage do so, as the school has built additional housing in recent years and the number of desirable apartments near campus is limited.

Student groups
A large number of student organizations are associated with the college. With its relative distance from a major city, and without a Greek life at Holy Cross, undergraduate social life revolves around a number of school-sponsored groups, events, and off-campus houses on nearby city streets (notably Boyden, Cambridge, Caro, Chelsea, College, and Southbridge streets) which are open to upperclassmen.

The college also features a variety of student journals, media, and newspapers including The Fenwick Review, a journal of conservative thought; The Advocate, a journal based in liberal principles; and The Spire, the weekly newspaper published by Holy Cross students for the college community. Free copies of the 4,000-circulation paper are available online or at campus newsstands on ten Friday mornings each semester. Holy Cross also has a student-run radio station, WCHC-FM 88.1. WCHC is a non-profit radio station that broadcasts commercial-free year round. The athletics department carries live broadcasts of many of the school's football, basketball, and hockey games. Holy Cross also has a law journal, The Holy Cross Journal of Law & Public Policy, which is published annually by undergraduate students.

The Campus Activities Board (CAB), a student-run organization, runs several committees that oversee campus-wide activities and student services with a focus on evening and weekend programming. The Student Government Association (SGA) charters and provides most of the funding for these programs, and represents students' interests when dealing with the administration. SGA was developed under a model of shared governance with the Division of Student Affairs. The SGA maintains that it represents students through college governance, offers student services, and launches new programs and initiatives. This government consists of a dual executive of co-presidents along with an Executive Cabinet. The legislature is bicameral and consists of the elected Senate and the larger General Assembly which draws its membership from student organizations. The SGA Judicial Council acts as the judiciary, hearing SGA-related appeals as well as those resulting from student parking violations issued by the Department of Public Safety. Finally, an Election Committee oversees student government elections and decides on appeals that result from them.

Alternate College Theatre (ACT) is a theatre group on campus where students take part in producing, designing, directing, writing, and acting in their own student-run productions. They work closely with the Theatre department on campus and put on three shows every year (two straight plays and one musical) along with various other productions and events.

The largest student organization at Holy Cross, Student Programs for Urban Development (SPUD), is a community service organization sponsored by the college Chaplains' Office consisting of over 45 different outreach programs and over 600 active members. Other volunteer and social justice programs offered by Holy Cross include Pax Christi, the Appalachia Service Project, Oxfam America (formerly Student Coalition on Hunger and Homelessness (SCOHAH)), and the Arrupe Immersion Program, named in honor of Fr. Pedro Arrupe, S.J., which Holy Cross describes as "a faith based program responding to the call to work for peace and justice in the world".

The Holy Cross Knights of Columbus council is the third oldest college council in the order having been established in 1929.

Traditions

Student life at the Holy Cross is marked by a number of unique traditions and celebrations:
 Pub Night: On most Tuesdays during the school year, seniors along with upperclassmen gather at the Pub located in the Hogan Campus Center. The event coincides with the "10 Spot", a weekly open mic night for Holy Cross bands and occasionally outside performers, which occurs next to the Pub.
 Stickball: Wheeler Hall is the most storied of the residence halls, known for its unique traditions. It is also the site for a popular campus sport known as stickball, a long-standing Holy Cross tradition usually played by Wheeler residents. It is estimated that Holy Cross students began playing stickball at Wheeler Hall around 1940, and the college has developed its own version of the sport. The sport lends itself to neighborhood stickball, and is played with a tennis ball and broomstick. Wheeler Hall's five floors and symmetrical design makes it an ideal setting for the playing and spectating of the sport. A hill behind home plate helps contribute to the playing area's natural amphitheater-like setting.
Battle of the Bands: Held the weekend prior to the end of classes, student-organized music groups compete to earn a coveted opening spot in the Sprint Weekend concert held the following weekend. Judges eliminate bands through a series of sets leading up to the final round, in which student attendees vote to select the winning band.
 Spring Weekend: The Spring Weekend, organized by the Campus Activities Board (CAB), is an annual event which marks the end of classes. Always held the week before finals, events include the Spring Carnival, fireworks, and a Spring Concert. In the past, invited performers have included the Pat McGee Band (2001), Wyclef Jean (2002), Third Eye Blind (2003, 2016), Howie Day (2004), The Roots (2004), Fabolous and The Starting Line (2005), Phantom Planet (2006), Guster (2006), Lupe Fiasco (2009), Drake (2010), J.Cole and the Far East Movement (2011), and Mac Miller and Walk the Moon (2013). Nelly and The Knocks performed a sold-out show in 2014. DJ Pup Dawg opened for Jessie J in 2015. In 2016, the recording artist JoJo opened for the headliner Third Eye Blind. The group Timeflies opened for T-Pain in 2017.
 100 Days Ball: Each spring, when 100 days are left at Holy Cross for the graduating Senior Class, the Purple Key Society (PKS), a service organization which fosters school spirit, loyalty, and enthusiasm, sponsors an informal dinner and dance in their honor. Tradition holds that attendees make a list of fellow seniors they would like to kiss, and attempt to follow through before the night is over.
 Purple Pride Day: Each year, the Purple Key Society chooses a day to banner the campus in the color purple, the official school color, to foster school spirit and pride. This includes giving out purple balloons, purple T-shirts, purple cookies, purple stickers, and various other items throughout the day. Purple Pride Day usually coincides with a Holy Cross sporting event.
 Cape Week: Following the close of the Spring semester, many students spend a week of vacation on Cape Cod.  Students typically rent homes or stay in nearby hotels for a few days of parties and gatherings.  Typically, students spend the week in Hyannis or in neighboring towns.

Insignia and representations of Holy Cross
Color
The school color is purple. There are two theories of how Holy Cross chose purple as its official color. One suggests it was derived from the royal purple used by Constantine the Great (born about 275 A.D., died in 337 A.D.) as displayed on his labarum (military standard) and on those of later Christian emperors of Rome.

College seal

The seal of the College of the Holy Cross is described as follows:

The outer circle states in Latin "College of the Holy Cross, Society of Jesus, Worcester, Massachusetts".

The inner shield contains an open book (symbol of learning) and a cross of gold (symbol of Christian faith). Written in the book is the college's motto, In Hoc Signo Vinces, which translates as, "By this sign thou shalt conquer". The phrase is credited to Constantine.

The cross divides the lower part of the shield into quarters, which are alternately red and sable, the colors on the ancient shield of Worcester, England. The upper part of the shield has in its center the emblem of the Society of Jesus, a blazing sun with the letters IHS, the first three letters of Jesus' name in Greek. On either side is a martlet, reminiscent of those on the ancestral crest of Bishop Fenwick.

Mascot
Holy Cross's athletic teams for both men and women are known as the Crusaders. It is reported that the name "Crusader" was first associated with Holy Cross in 1884 at an alumni banquet in Boston, where an engraved Crusader mounted on an armored horse appeared at the head of the menu. In 2018, the college decided to phase out of using the Knight imagery, retiring the Holy Cross mascot Iggy T. Crusader. Holy Cross opted instead for the secondary (now primary) logo of a purple shield with an interlocking "HC".

Motto
The Latin motto In Hoc Signo Vinces, "In This Sign You Shall Conquer", has been attributed to Emperor Constantine the Great, a Roman emperor noted for his tolerance of Christians. According to some historians, Constantine had a dream or vision of a flaming cross in the sky with this inscription on the day preceding his decisive victory over Maxentius at the Milvian Bridge (October 28, 312). This victory led to his capturing Rome and convinced him of the importance of Christianity.

Athletics

Holy Cross sponsors 27 varsity sports, all of which compete at the NCAA Division I level (FCS for football). The Crusaders are members of the Patriot League, the Atlantic Hockey Association, and Hockey East Conference in women's hockey. Of its 27 varsity teams, Holy Cross supports 13 men's and 14 women's sports. The carrying of 26 Division I varsity programs gives Holy Cross the largest ratio of teams-per-enrollment in the country.

The college is a founding member of the Patriot League, and boasts that one-quarter of its student body participates in its varsity athletic programs. For the first decade of its existence, Patriot League schools did not offer athletic scholarships. The league began allowing schools to offer athletic scholarships for all sports except football in 2001, after American University joined the league, and in 2012 league members were authorized to offer football scholarships as well.

Principal athletic facilities include the Fitton Field football stadium (capacity 23,500), Hart Recreation Center's basketball court (3,600), the newly renovated Fitton Field baseball park also called Hanover Insurance Park at Fitton Field (3,000), Holy Cross Field House, Hart Ice Rink (1,600), Linda Johnson Smith Stadium (1,320), and Smith Wellness Center located inside the Hart Center. The Linda Johnson Smith Soccer Stadium opened in the fall of 2006.

Holy Cross is one of eight schools to have won an NCAA championship in both baseball and basketball, having won the 1952 College World Series and the 1947 NCAA Men's Division I Basketball Tournament. The college has also won the 1954 National Invitation Tournament and participated in the 1946 Orange Bowl. Since electing to focus more on academics than athletics, the college has had several notable moments on the national stage. In 2006, the Holy Cross men's ice hockey team upset the No. 1 seed Minnesota Golden Gophers in the 2006 NCAA Division I Men's Ice Hockey Tournament. In 2016, the Holy Cross men's basketball team qualified for the NCAA tournament, earning its first tournament win since 1953. In 2017, the Holy Cross baseball team earned a bid to the NCAA tournament, defeating no. 25 ranked Nebraska in the Corvallis Regional.

Alumni

Holy Cross had more 38,000 alumni as of November, 2021. There are currently 25 active alumni clubs in the U.S. and 1 international club. A number of Holy Cross alumni have made significant contributions in the fields of government, law, academia, business, arts, journalism, and athletics, among others. As of 2019, the alumni median salary for a recent Holy Cross graduate was $62,800; the mid-career median salary for a Holy Cross graduate was $129,700.

Clarence Thomas, United States Supreme Court Justice; Chris Matthews, host of MSNBC's Hardball with Chris Matthews and NBC's The Chris Matthews Show; and Basketball Hall of Fame members and Boston Celtics immortals Bob Cousy and Tom Heinsohn are among the college's most famous alumni. LSD pioneer Timothy Leary was a student at Holy Cross, though he withdrew after two years. Michael Harrington, author of The Other America and an influential figure in initiating the 1960s War on Poverty, was a graduate of the college, as was the famed pacifist leader Phillip Berrigan. Wendell Arthur Garrity, United States federal judge famous for issuing the 1974 order that Boston schools be desegregated by means of busing, is also an alumnus. Washington, D.C. super lawyer Edward Bennett Williams was a graduate. In addition to his legal career, Williams owned the Washington Redskins and Baltimore Orioles.

Bob Casey, Sr., Pennsylvania governor, Bob Casey, Jr., his son, Pennsylvania treasurer and U.S. Senator, and Edward D. DiPrete, Governor of Rhode Island are among the most notable alumni with involvement in politics. Jon Favreau, Director of Speechwriting for President Barack Obama and co-creator of Pod Save America. Mark Kennedy Shriver, member of the Kennedy political family and Vice President and managing director of U.S. Programs for the charity Save the Children, graduated from Holy Cross in 1986.
In 2003, an honorary degree and public platform was given to pro-choice Holy Cross alumnus Chris Matthews despite pro-life alumni objections. College President Fr. Michael McFarland defended the invitation and degree, despite clear direction from the United States Conference of Catholic Bishop policies and Catholic Church policies never to give a public platform to those at odds with central holdings of the Church, such as the teachings on abortion. McFarland along with the majority of the current Holy Cross community continue to defend this, stating that while Matthews is pro-choice, that is not his defining characteristic and he did not talk purely about abortion in his speech.

Several alumni have held top positions in the world of business and finance: Bob Wright, Chairman & CEO, NBC Universal, and Vice Chairman, General Electric; James David Power III, J.D. Power and Associates founder; William J. McDonough, President of the Federal Reserve Bank of New York and Vice Chairman of Merrill Lynch.

In media and the arts, Holy Cross has several distinguished alumni: Ann Dowd, Emmy-winning actress best known for her roles in The Handmaid's Tale and The Leftovers; Neil Hopkins, actor best known for his roles in Lost and Nip/Tuck; Bill Simmons, ESPN.com sports columnist and head of The Ringer, Channel 33, and the Bill Simmons Podcast Network; Dan Shaughnessy, sports columnist for The Boston Globe; Bartlett Sher, Tony Award-winning Broadway director; Joe McGinniss, bestselling author of The Selling of the President, Fatal Vision, and other books; Edward P. Jones, 2004 Pulitzer Prize winner in fiction for writing The Known World; Billy Collins, 2001–03 Poet Laureate of the United States; Dave Anderson, The New York Times sports columnist, 1981 winner of the Pulitzer Prize for Commentary; Jack Higgins, editorial cartoonist for the Chicago Sun-Times, 1989 winner of the Pulitzer Prize for Editorial Cartooning; and Kevin O'Connor, the host of TV's This Old House. In art and architecture, Vito Acconci.

In the sciences, Holy Cross also has several notable alumni, including Joseph Murray, winner of the 1990 Nobel Prize in Medicine; immunologist Anthony Fauci, head of the National Institute of Allergy and Infectious Diseases (NIAID) and chief medical advisor to the president; and MacArthur Foundation "genius" bioengineer Jim Collins.

See also
 List of Jesuit sites
 List of presidents of the College of the Holy Cross
 National Register of Historic Places listings in eastern Worcester, Massachusetts

References

External links

Holy Cross Athletics website

 
Educational institutions established in 1843
Jesuit universities and colleges in the United States
Catholic universities and colleges in Massachusetts
Association of Catholic Colleges and Universities
Catholic Church in Massachusetts
Universities and colleges in Boston
University and college buildings on the National Register of Historic Places in Massachusetts
National Register of Historic Places in Worcester, Massachusetts
College of the Holy Cross
Universities and colleges in Worcester, Massachusetts
Patriot League
1843 establishments in Massachusetts